M63 or M-63 may refer to:

M63 mine, a French anti-personnel mine
M63 motorway, a former designation for a road in Greater Manchester
M-63 Plamen a multiple rocket launcher
M-63 (Michigan highway), a state highway in Michigan
Messier 63, a spiral galaxy in the constellation Canes Venatici
Stoner M63, an assault rifle/light machine gun
A model of Mercedes AMG
A developed version of the M62 (later designated as Shvetsov ASh-62) aero-engine